Controller Aircraft (CA), originally Controller of Aircraft, is a senior (3 star) British Ministry of Defence appointment who is responsible for delivering an airworthy aircraft to the Services, whereupon the Service issues a Release to Service (RTS), releasing the aircraft into service. The difference between CA Release and RTS is normally one of Build Standard. Although usually held by a Royal Air Force officer, several civil servants have held the post in the 20th century. The incumbent is a member of the Air Force Board.

History
Prior to 1953, the equivalent responsibilities were held by Controller of Supplies (Air). In 1971 the post was moved from the Ministry of Technology to the Ministry of Defence's Procurement Executive.

Controllers
The following officers have held the post:

9 November 1953 Air Chief Marshal Sir John Baker
1956 Air Chief Marshal Sir Claude Pelly
1959 Sir George Gardner 
1963 Morien Morgan
1967 Air Marshal Sir Christopher Hartley
1 September 1970 Air Marshal Sir Peter Fletcher
1 June 1973 Air Chief Marshal Sir Neil Wheeler
8 November 1975 Air Chief Marshal Sir Douglas Lowe
 1982: David Howard Perry
1 January 1983 Air Chief Marshal Sir John Rogers
20 January 1986 Air Marshal Sir David Harcourt-Smith
1989 Sir Donald M Spiers
1994 Air Marshal Sir Roger Austin
1997 Air Marshal Sir Peter Norriss
2000 Air Vice-Marshal B M Thornton
2003 Air Vice-Marshal D N Williams
April 2004 Air Vice-Marshal S G G Dalton
20 April 2006 Air Vice-Marshal S D Butler

References

External links

Royal Air Force appointments
Aviation licenses and certifications